|}

The Poule d'Essai des Poulains is a Group 1 flat horse race in France open to three-year-old thoroughbred colts. It is run over a distance of 1,600 metres (about 1 mile) at Longchamp in May. It is France's equivalent of the 2000 Guineas run in Britain.

History

Origins
The Poule d'Essai, an event for three-year-old colts and fillies, was established in France in 1840. It was inspired by two races in England, the 2000 Guineas (for colts and fillies) and the 1000 Guineas (for fillies only).

The race was initially staged at the Champ de Mars. Its first running was over one full circuit of the track (about 2,000 metres). It was cut to a three-quarter lap (1,500 metres) in 1841. It was cancelled due to insufficient entries in 1843 and 1844.

The Poule d'Essai was transferred to Longchamp in 1857. It was extended to 1,600 metres in 1867. It was abandoned because of the Franco-Prussian War in 1871. It continued to be run until 1882.

Modern version
The Poule d'Essai des Poulains was created in 1883, when the Poule d'Essai was divided into two separate races. The "Poulains" was restricted to colts, and the Poule d'Essai des Pouliches was reserved for fillies.

The events were cancelled throughout World War I, with no runnings from 1915 to 1918. There were two 1,800-metre replacement races at Chantilly in 1917. The version for colts was called the Critérium d'Essai des Poulains.

The "Poulains" and "Pouliches" were not run in the spring of 1940, but a substitute combining both races took place at Auteuil in October. Titled the Prix d'Essai, it was won by the colt Djebel.

The Poule d'Essai des Poulains was held at Le Tremblay in 1943, and Maisons-Laffitte in 1944 and 1945.

The present race grading system was introduced in 1971, and the event was given Group 1 status. It was switched from Longchamp's middle course (moyenne piste) to the main course (grande piste) in 1987.

The leading horses from the Poule d'Essai des Poulains sometimes go on to compete in the Prix du Jockey Club. The last to win both races was St Mark's Basilica in 2021.

Records

Leading jockey (6 wins):
 Freddy Head – Green Dancer (1975), Red Lord (1976), Blushing John (1988), Linamix (1990), Hector Protector (1991), Shanghai (1992)

Leading trainer (11 wins):
 Robert Denman – Regain (1883), Archiduc (1884), Vinicius (1903), Gouvernant (1904), Val d'Or (1905), Ouadi Halfa (1907), Lord Burgoyne (1911), Dagor (1913), Le Traquet (1921), Sir Gallahad (1923), Asterus (1926)

Leading owner (8 wins):
 Edmond Blanc – Arreau (1896), Governor (1900), Vinicius (1903), Gouvernant (1904), Val d'Or (1905), Ouadi Halfa (1907), Lord Burgoyne (1911), Dagor (1913)
 HH Aga Khan IV – Buisson Ardent (1956), Zeddaan (1968), Kalamoun (1973), Blushing Groom (1977), Nishapour (1978), Ashkalani (1996), Daylami (1997), Sendawar (1999)

Winners since 1970

 Faraway Son finished first in 1970, but he was relegated to third place following a stewards' inquiry.

 River Mist finished first in 1985, but he was relegated to fourth place following a stewards' inquiry.

 Noverre was first in 2001, but he was subsequently disqualified after testing positive for a banned substance.

 The 2016 and 2017 runnings took place at Deauville while Longchamp was closed for redevelopment.

 The 2020 running took place at Deauville on 1 June as Longchamp was closed owing to the COVID-19 pandemic.

Earlier winners

Poule d'Essai

 1840: Giges
 1841: Fiammetta
 1842: Annetta
 1843–44: no race
 1845: Commodor Napier
 1846: Philip Shah
 1847: Tronquette
 1848: Gambetti
 1849: Experience
 1850: Saint Germain
 1851: First Born
 1852: Bounty
 1853: Moustique
 1854: Nancy
 1855: Monarque
 1856: Nat
 1857: Florin
 1858: Brocoli
 1859: Bakaloum
 1860: Gustave
 1861: Isabella
 1862: Stradella
 1863: Stentor
 1864: Baronella
 1865: Gontran
 1866: Puebla
 1867: Nicolet
 1868: Gouvernail
 1869: Consul
 1870: Valois
 1871: no race
 1872: Revigny
 1873: Sire
 1874: Novateur
 1875: Saint Cyr
 1876: Enguerrande
 1877: Fontainebleau
 1878: Clementine
 1879: Zut
 1880: Le Destrier
 1881: Promethee
 1882: Barbe Bleu

Poule d'Essai des Poulains

 1883: Regain
 1884: Archiduc
 1885: Xaintrailles
 1886: Gamin
 1887: Brio
 1888: Reyezuelo
 1889: Phlegethon
 1890: Heaume
 1891: Le Hardy
 1892: Fra Angelico
 1893: Le Nicham
 1894: Beaujolais
 1895: Launay
 1896: Arreau
 1897: Indian Chief
 1898: Rodilard
 1899: Perth
 1900: Governor
 1901: Cheri
 1902: Retz
 1903: Vinicius
 1904: Gouvernant
 1905: Val d'Or
 1906: Eider
 1907: Ouadi Halfa
 1908: Monitor
 1909: Verdun
 1910: Sifflet
 1911: Lord Burgoyne
 1912: De Viris
 1913: Dagor
 1914: Listman
 1915–18: no race
 1919: McKinley
 1920: Pendennis
 1921: Le Traquet
 1922: Mont Blanc
 1923: Sir Gallahad
 1924: Tapin
 1925: Faraway
 1926: Asterus
 1927: Fiterari
 1928: Dark Lantern
 1929: Vatout
 1930: Xandover
 1931: Indus
 1932: Le Becau
 1933: Rodosto
 1934: Brantome
 1935: Kant
 1936: Davout
 1937: Drap d'Or
 1938: Gaspillage
 1939: Mac Kann
 1940: Djebel
 1941: Panipat
 1942: Hexton
 1943: Dogat
 1944: Prince Bio
 1945: Mistral
 1946: Pactole
 1947: Tourment
 1948: Rigolo
 1949: Amour Drake
 1950: Tantieme
 1951: Free Man
 1952: Guersant
 1953: Cobalt
 1954: Cote d'Or
 1955: Klairon
 1956: Buisson Ardent
 1957: Tyrone
 1958: Pres du Feu
 1959: Thymus
 1960: Mincio
 1961: Right Royal
 1962: Adamastor
 1963: Relko
 1964: Neptunus
 1965: Cambremont
 1966: Soleil
 1967: Blue Tom
 1968: Zeddaan
 1969: Don II

See also
 List of French flat horse races

References

 France Galop / Racing Post:
 galop.courses-france.com:
 1840–1859, 1860–1889, 1890–1919, 1920–1949, 1950–1979, 1980–present

 france-galop.com – A Brief History: Poule d'Essai des Poulains.
 galopp-sieger.de – Poule d'Essai des Poulains.
 horseracingintfed.com – International Federation of Horseracing Authorities – Poule d'Essai des Poulains (2017).
 pedigreequery.com – Poule d'Essai des Poulains – Longchamp.
 tbheritage.com – Poule d'Essai des Poulains.

Flat horse races for three-year-olds
Longchamp Racecourse
Horse races in France
1883 establishments in France
Recurring sporting events established in 1883